Mythos: Rivista di Storia delle Religioni is an annual peer-reviewed academic journal published by Giuseppe Sciascia Editore on behalf of the University of Palermo. It was established in 1989 by Giuseppe Martorana, with a new series started in 2007. It reviews religious narrative and mythos in Italian, French, English, German, and Spanish. The current editors-in-chief are Nicola Cusumano (University of Palermo) and Corinne Bonnet (University of Toulouse).

References

External links 
  
  
 

Academic journals associated with universities and colleges
Religious studies journals
Multilingual journals
Annual journals
Publications established in 1989
University of Palermo